Colorado's 13th Senate district is one of 35 districts in the Colorado Senate. It has been represented by Democrat Kevin Priola since 2023. Prior to redistricting the district was represented by Republicans John Cooke and Scott Renfroe.

Geography
District 13 is based around the city of Greeley, also covering the other Weld County communities of Evans, LaSalle, Milliken, Gilcrest, Platteville, and Fort Lupton.

The district is located entirely within Colorado's 4th congressional district, and overlaps with the 48th, 50th, and 63rd districts of the Colorado House of Representatives.

Recent election results
Colorado state senators are elected to staggered four-year terms. The old 13th district held elections in midterm years, but the new district drawn following the 2020 Census will hold elections in presidential years.

Incumbent Senator John Cooke is term-limited in 2022, and 25th district Senator Kevin Priola, who was redistricted into the 13th district, will take his place beginning in 2023.

2018

2014

Federal and statewide results in District 13

References 

13
Weld County, Colorado